NYK Vesta is a large container ship operated by Nippon Yusen Kaisha and its port of registry  is Panama, Panama.

Hull and engine
NYK Vesta is a fully cellular container ship with a capacity of 8100 TEU. NYK Vesta was built by Hyundai Heavy Industries in Ulsan yard number 1716; was finished in April 2007. The dimensions of the hull are a length of 338m, beam of 46m, draught of 15m, and depth of 20m, while the tonnage is 103260.

NYK Vesta is powered by a MAN B&W 2 stroke 12 cylinder engine (design 12K98ME) capable of producing 68,666 kW(93,369 hp) driving a 1 FP propeller. This ship can reach speeds of 25kt.

References

External links
NYK Line

Container ships
Ships of the NYK Line
2007 ships